Daulatkhan is an upazila of Bhola District in the Division of Barisal, Bangladesh.

Geography

It is bounded by Bhola sadar and Lakshmipur sadar upazilas on the north, Burhanuddin and Tazumuddin upazilas on the south, Ramgati upazila on the east, and Bhola Sadar upazila on the west.

Demographics
Par the 2001 Bangladesh census, Daulatkhan had a population of 173253, including male 90670, female 82583; Muslim 168823, Hindu 4401 and others 29.

According to the 1991 Bangladesh census, Daulatkhan had a population of 153,458, of whom 69,112 were aged 18 or older. Males constituted 52.54% of the population, and females 47.46%. Daulatkhan had an average literacy rate of 24.5% (7+ years), against the national average of 32.4%.

Administration
Daulatkhan Thana was formed in 1872 and it was turned into an upazila on 1 August 1983.

Daulatkhan Upazila is divided into Daulatkhan Municipality and nine union parishads: Char Khalipa, Charpata, Dakshin Joynagar, Hazipur, Madanpur, Madua, Sayedpur, Uttar Joynagar, and Vhovanipur. The union parishads are subdivided into 25 mauzas and 25 villages.

Daulatkhan Municipality is subdivided into 9 wards and 9 mahallas.

See also
Upazilas of Bangladesh
Districts of Bangladesh
Divisions of Bangladesh

References

Upazilas of Bhola District